Elimeleh Leventhal (born 18 March 1953) is an Israeli former footballer. He competed in the men's tournament at the 1976 Summer Olympics.

References

External links
 
 
 

1953 births
Living people
Israeli footballers
Israel international footballers
Hapoel Haifa F.C. players
Beitar Jerusalem F.C. players
Footballers from Haifa
Olympic footballers of Israel
Footballers at the 1976 Summer Olympics
Association football midfielders
Asian Games medalists in football
Asian Games silver medalists for Israel
Footballers at the 1974 Asian Games
Medalists at the 1974 Asian Games